This is the list of supermarket chains in Kenya.

Foreign-based supermarket chains
 Carrefour
 Game Stores
 Village Supermarket

Locally based supermarket chains
 Chandarana Supermarkets
 Eastmatt Supermarkets
 Uchumi Supermarkets
 Maathai Supermarkets 
 Quick Mart Limited
 Naivas Limited 
 Society Stores Supermarkets

See also 
 List of supermarket chains in Africa
 List of supermarket chains

References

External links
 Modeling Agility In Kenyan Supermarkets Chain Expansion

Kenya

Economy of Kenya
Supermarket chains
Kenya